Dimitar Vezalov (born 13 April 1987) is a Bulgarian football defender who primarily plays as a centre back and occasionally in the left back position. He currently plays for Botev Ihtiman.

Honours

Club
Lokomotiv Plovdiv
 Bulgarian Cup: 2018–19

References

External links 
 Profile at LevskiSofia.info

Bulgarian footballers
1987 births
Living people
Association football defenders
First Professional Football League (Bulgaria) players
FC Lyubimets players
PFC Beroe Stara Zagora players
PFC Levski Sofia players
Botev Plovdiv players
PFC Slavia Sofia players
FC Bansko players
Zagłębie Sosnowiec players
PFC Lokomotiv Plovdiv players
FC Hebar Pazardzhik players
Expatriate footballers in Poland
People from Bansko
Sportspeople from Blagoevgrad Province